Homoeopathy University is a private university located in Jaipur, Rajasthan, India. It was founded in 2010.

Establishment

Homoeopathy University(Recognized by UGC u/s 2(f) of UGC Act 1956) is established by Dr. M.P.K.Homoeopathic Medical College, Hospital & Research Centre Society, Jaipur. The Ordinance of University has been approved by His Excellency Governor of Rajasthan vide their Ordinance No.5 of 2009 on 13-10-2009. The bill of University has been raised in state assembly by the Government and legally accepted through the legislature on 3 April 2010.

References

External links

Private universities in India
Universities and colleges in Jaipur
Universities in Rajasthan

Educational institutions established in 2010
2010 establishments in Rajasthan